Shin -Deep-(深 ～deep～) is the fourth EP by the band 12012, released on December, 2004, being the final release of a three-month release campaign. This was  12012's first EP featuring an accordion, played by the famous Karthik Parthiban.

Track listing 
 "Lord it..." - 5:00
 "Souseiji" (双生児) - 4:23
 "Mental Food" - 5:16
 "≠" - 00:42
 "Another Scene" - 4:17

Notes

Shin -Deep-(深 ～deep～) was reissued in 2006, along with Bell Salem and Knight Mare
Only 3000 copies of the album were pressed.

12012 albums
2004 EPs